Astacoidea is superfamily of freshwater crayfish that live in the Northern Hemisphere. The other superfamily of crayfish, Parastacoidea, lives in the Southern Hemisphere. Astacoidea consists of three families: Astacidae (from Europe and western North America), Cambaridae (from eastern North America), and Cambaroididae (from eastern Asia). Crayfish are closely related to lobsters, as shown in the simplified cladogram below:

References

Crayfish
Freshwater crustaceans
Crustacean taxonomy
Arthropod superfamilies
Taxa named by Pierre André Latreille